Rodolfo Vanoli (born 11 January 1963) is an Italian professional football manager and former player.

Playing career
Vanoli, a defender, started his career with Varese. He then went on to play football professionally, making his Serie A debut in 1985 with Lecce. In 1989 he joined Udinese, playing Serie A and Serie B with the Friuliani. He retired in 2000 after a single season with Swiss club FC Chiasso.

Managerial career
Vanoli started his career as a coach in Switzerland. In 2010 he returned to Italy and took charge at Colligiana. He moved to Pordenone in 2011. Vanoli worked in Slovenia as a manager of Koper and Olimpija Ljubljana.

In 2019, he was appointed head coach of Serie C club Bisceglie, eventually saving them from relegation and being confirmed for the 2019–20 season. He was dismissed on 2 October 2019 due to poor results.

In February 2021, Vanoli returned to Koper and signed a contract for the remainder of the 2020–21 season.

Personal life
He has a younger brother, Paolo, who is also a former footballer and current coach.

Honours

Manager
Koper
Slovenian Cup: 2014–15
Slovenian Supercup: 2015

Olimpija Ljubljana
Slovenian PrvaLiga: 2015–16

References

External links
Lecce.it profile

1963 births
Living people
Sportspeople from the Province of Varese
Footballers from Lombardy
Italian footballers
Italian expatriate footballers
Association football defenders
S.S.D. Varese Calcio players
U.S. Lecce players
Udinese Calcio players
S.P.A.L. players
FC Chiasso players
Italian expatriate sportspeople in Switzerland
Expatriate footballers in Switzerland
Serie B players
Serie C players
Serie A players
Italian football managers
Italian expatriate football managers
Italian expatriate sportspeople in Slovenia
Italian expatriate sportspeople in Albania
FC Lugano managers
AC Bellinzona managers
Pordenone Calcio managers
FC Koper managers
NK Olimpija Ljubljana (2005) managers
FK Dinamo Tirana managers
Expatriate football managers in Switzerland
Expatriate football managers in Slovenia
Expatriate football managers in Albania